Ramón Silva Abaitua was a Spanish footballer who played as a defender for Athletic Club (now known as Athletic Bilbao). He was one of the co-founders of Athletic Club in 1901 and was part of the team that won the 1902 Copa de la Coronación, the first national championship disputed in Spain. The dates of his birth and death are unknown.

Playing career

Athletic Club
On 5 September 1901, he and his brother Luis were two of the 33 socios (co-founders) who signed the documents that officially established the Athletic Club at the historic meeting in Café García. He was then one of the first football players of the newly created Basque team, with whom he played several friendly matches against city rivals Bilbao Football Club) in the Hippodrome of Lamiako.

The Silva brothers, and especially Ramón, were pivotal figures in this historic rivalry that served as one of the drivers of football as a mass phenomenon in Bilbao since their duels aroused great expectation. On 19 January 1902, Silva scored the opening goal to help his side to an eventual 4–2, which not only marked Athletic's first victory over Bilbao FC in four matches, but also the first time that a paid match was held in Biscay, since they charged a ticket price of 30 cents of a peseta.

Club Bizcaya
In 1902, the two rivals agreed to join the best players of each club to face the Bordeaux-based side Burdigala. This temporary merge became known as Club Bizcaya and Silva ousted Bilbao FC's English forwards for a spot in the first-ever line-up of the Bizcaya team against Burdigala on 9 March, netting the opening goal in an 0–2 win in France. Three weeks later, on 31 March 1902, he was again in Bizcaya's starting XI for the return fixture at Lamiako, the first visit by a foreign team to Bilbao, helping his side to a 7–0 win over the French side. 

Together with Juan Astorquia, William Dyer, Walter Evans and his brother, he was part of the Bizcaya team that won the first national championship disputed in Spain, the 1902 Copa de la Coronación, the forerunner for the Copa del Rey. He featured in the final alongside his brother and helped his side to a 2–1 win over FC Barcelona.

Notably, he was one of the eleven players who started for Athletic in their infamous 11–1 win over FC Barcelona on 15 April 1906.

Honours
Club Bizcaya
Copa de la Coronación: 1902

References

Year of birth missing
Year of death missing
Spanish footballers
Athletic Bilbao footballers
Association football forwards
Footballers from Bilbao